Cedric Coutouly (born 16 January 1980 in Albi) is a former French cyclist. He participated in the 2006 Tour de France and finished in 131st place.

Major results
2003
2nd Brussels Opwijk
2004
1st Overall Tour du Tarn-et-Garonne
2005
2nd Tro-Bro Léon
2006
2nd Paris–Camembert
2nd Paris–Troyes
4th Le Samyn
2010
1st Prologue Tour Alsace (TTT)

References

1980 births
Living people
French male cyclists
Sportspeople from Albi
Cyclists from Occitania (administrative region)